Parker is a surname of English origin, derived from Old French with the meaning "keeper of the park". "Parker" was also a nickname given to gamekeepers in medieval England. In the United States, it ranked in 1990 as the 47th most-common surname.

A
Aaron Parker (born 1986), American soccer player
Aaron Parker (American football) (born 1998), American football player
A. J. Parker (born 1998), American football player
Alan Parker (1944–2020), English film director
Alison Parker, news reporter victim of Murders of Alison Parker and Adam Ward in 2015
Alton B. Parker, American judge and presidential candidate
Andrea Parker, American actress 
Andrea Grimes Parker, American computer scientist
Angel Parker, American actress
Anthony Parker (born 1975), American NBA basketball player and general manager of Lakeland Magic
Arthur C. Parker, American archaeologist
Ashley Parker (born 1982), U.S. journalist

B
Bertha Parker Pallan (1907–1978), archaeologist of Abenaki and Seneca descent
Bonnie Parker (1910–1934), American outlaw
Brandon Parker (born 1995), American football player
Buddy Lee Parker, ring name of American wrestler DeWayne Bruce (born 1962)

C
Caitlin Parker (born 1996), Australian boxer
Candace Parker (born 1986), American basketball player
Camilla Parker Bowles, Camilla, Duchess of Cornwall
Cameron Parker, Scottish businessman
Cary Millholland Parker, American landscape architect
Charles Parker (disambiguation), several people, including:
Charlie Parker (1920–1955), American jazz musician
Claire Parker, American engineer and animator
Chris Parker (disambiguation), several people
Clifton Parker, English composer
Colonel Tom Parker (1909–1997), Dutch-American manager of Elvis Presley
Constance-Anne Parker (1921–2016), British sculptor
Corey Parker (disambiguation), several people
Critchley Parker (1862–1944), Australian newspaperman, also his son (died 1942)
Cynthia Ann Parker, American captive of Comanche

D
Dave Parker (born 1951), American baseball player 
Dave Parker (rock musician), American musician 
Dave Parker (rugby), English rugby league player
Daniel Parker (artist) (born 1959), American sculptor 
Dawaun Parker, hip hop producer
Deborah Parker (born 1970), American activist and indigenous leader
Dee Parker (died 2000), American actress
Devante Parker (born 1996), German soccer footballer
DeVante Parker (born 1993), American football player
Donald C. Parker, American physician and amateur astronomer
Dorothy Parker (born Dorothy Rothschild), American writer
Douglas H. Parker (1926–2019), American law school professor

E
Eddie Parker (pool player) (c. 1932–2001), American pool player, believed by many to have been the inspiration for the character "Fast Eddie" Felson in the novel The Hustler and two films
Edie Parker (artist) (born 1956), Canadian sculptor
Edna Parker (1893–2008), American supercentenarian
E. T. Parker Ernest Tilden Parker, (1926–1991), mathematics professor
Edward Harper Parker (1849–1926), English barrister and sinologist
Edwin Wallace Parker (1833–1901), Methodist bishop
Eleanor Parker (1922–2013), American actress
Ellis Parker Butler (1869–1937), American author
Ely S. Parker (1828–1895), Seneca attorney and engineer
Eugene Parker (1927-2022), American astrophysicist
Eugene Parker (sports agent) (1956-2016), American sports agent
Evan Parker (born 1944), British saxophone player

F
Ferdinand Lucas Parker (1885–1959), South Australian public servant
Fess Parker (1924–2010), American actor
Franklin Parker (1902–1962), American character actor

G
Garry Parker, English footballer
Geoff Parker, English biology professor
Geoffrey Parker (historian)
George Parker (disambiguation), several people
Gerad Parker, (born 1981), American football coach
Gloria Parker (1921–2022), American musician and bandleader
Gordon Parker (disambiguation), several people
Graham Parker, English singer-songwriter
Grant Parker, classics professor

H
Hampton Wildman Parker, English zoologist and author
Hattie Parker, American soprano soloist with the Pace Jubilee Singers
Henry E. Parker (1928–2018), American politician and Connecticut State Treasurer
Horatio Parker (1863–1919), American composer

I

Ira W. Parker (1877–1960), American politician
Isaac Parker (1838–1896), U.S. Judge for the Indian Territory
Ivan Parker, American gospel singer
Ivy Parker, American chemist and engineer

J
Jabari Parker (born 1995), American basketball player
Jack Parker (disambiguation), several people
James Parker (disambiguation), several people
Jamie Parker, English actor
Jamie Parker (politician), Australian Greens politician
Jane E. Parker, British botanist 
Jean Parker (1915–2005), American actress
John Parker (disambiguation), several people
Johnny Parker (jazz pianist), jazz pianist
Jonathan Parker (born 1937), British judge and mediator
Jonathan Parker (politician), American politician
Joseph Parker (boxer) (born 1992), New Zealand boxer

K
Kathleen Parker, American journalist
Kathleen Parker (politician), American politician
Keigan Parker, Scottish footballer
Kevin Parker (musician), Australian musician
Kevin Parker (New York politician), New York state senator
Kim Ian Parker (born 1956), Canadian religious studies scholar
K.J. Parker, pen name of British author Tom Holt

L
Lauren Parker (born 1988), Australian paratriathlete
Lilian Parker (1874–1947), British artist
Linda Vivienne Parker (born 1958), judge of the United States District Court for the Eastern District of Michigan
Liza Parker (born 1980), English badminton player
Lowell Holden Parker, American politician
Luther Parker, American politician
Lyn Parker (born 1952), British civil servant, diplomat, and legal scholar
Lynne Parker, American roboticist

M
Margaret Eleanor Parker (1827–1896), British activist, reformer, and travel writer
Mary-Louise Parker (born 1964), American actress
Marshall Parker, South Carolina politician
Maceo Parker, American saxophonist
Mary Ann Parker, English traveller and writer (1765/6–1848)
Matt Parker, Australian stand-up comedian, author, YouTube personality and maths communicator
Matthew Parker, Archbishop of Canterbury
Maurice S. Parker, United States diplomat
Maurice W. Parker Sr. voice coach, champion rifle shot and billiard player
Wes Parker Maurice W. Parker, III American baseball player
Maynard T. Parker, American politician
Melvin Parker, American drummer
Milo Parker, English actor

N
Nate Parker (born 1979), American actor and filmmaker
Nathaniel Parker (born 1962), English actor
Nicholas Parker (disambiguation), several people
Nico Parker (born 2004), British actress
Nicole Parker (born 1978), American actor and singer

O
Ol Parker (born 1969), English director, producer and screenwriter
Oliver Parker (born 1960), English director, screenwriter and actor

P
Parker (Hampshire cricketer), English cricketer playing 1803–1806
Paige Parker (born 1995), Australian rules footballer
Paul Parker (disambiguation), several people
Pauline Parker, of the Parker-Hulme murder
Pete Parker (Lionel Dyke Parker), Canadian radio announcer
Peter Parker (disambiguation), several people
Pomeroy Parker, American Medal of Honor recipient
Prosper P. Parker (1836–1918), Canadian-born American engineer and politician

Q
Quanah Parker, Comanche leader

R
Ray Parker Jr. (born 1954), American musician
Robert Parker (disambiguation), several people
Roland Parker (1925–2020), English first-class cricketer
Ross Parker (songwriter), songwriter, actor, and pianist
Ross Parker, 2001 murder victim

S
Sarah Parker, North Carolina judge
Sarah Jessica Parker (born 1965), American actress
Scott Parker, English footballer
Sean Parker (born 1979), American entrepreneur
Shane A. Parker, Australian ornithologist
Shawn Parker (born 1993), German footballer
Sidney Parker (anarchist), British anarchist
Sista Monica Parker (1956–2014), American singer, songwriter, and record producer
Sonny Parker (disambiguation), several people
Stephen Parker (disambiguation), several people
Steve Parker (disambiguation), several people
Steven Parker (disambiguation), several people
Stewart Parker (scientist), British scientist
Stuart Parker (disambiguation), several people
Suzy Parker, American model and actor

T
Tan Parker, member of the Texas House of Representatives
Theodore Parker, Unitarian minister
Theodore A. Parker III, ornithologist
Theodore W. Parker, United States Army General
Thomas Parker (disambiguation), several people
Timothy Britten Parker "Toby" Parker, American actor
Timothy Parker (puzzle designer), crossword puzzle creator
Tom Parker (disambiguation), several people
Tony Parker (born 1982), French basketball player
Tony Parker (basketball, born 1993) (born 1993), American basketball player
Trey Parker (born 1969), American animator and filmmaker

U
Una-Mary Parker (1930–2019), English journalist and novelist

W
Walter Richard Parker, Victoria Cross recipient
Wes Parker, American baseball player
William Parker (disambiguation), several people

Z
Zach Parker (born 1994), British boxer

Fictional characters
Parker siblings, recurring characters in The Vampire Diaries television series
Parker (Stark novels character), ruthless criminal in novels by Donald E. Westlake writing as Richard Stark
Parker, the butler in Oscar Wilde's Lady Windermere's Fan
Aloysius Parker, in the British 1960s television series Thunderbirds
Benjamin Parker, Spider-Man's Uncle.
Drake Parker, Drake & Josh characters
Jennifer Parker, in the Back to the Future film series
 Jennifer Parker, the main protagonist in the 1980 novel, Rage of Angels
 Jennifer Parker, in the 1994 television series, My Brother and Me 
Kristen Parker, in the A Nightmare on Elm Street film series
May Parker, Spider-Man's Aunt.
 Peter Parker, the public identity of the Marvel Comics' superhero Spider-Man
 Peter Parker (Sam Raimi film series), his counterpart in Sam Raimi's Spider-Man trilogy
 Peter Parker (The Amazing Spider-Man film series), his counterpart in The Amazing Spider-Man film series
 Peter Parker (Marvel Cinematic Universe), his counterpart in the Marvel Cinematic Universe
 Peter Parker (Insomniac Games character), his counterpart in Insomniac Games' Spider-Man games
 Kaine Parker, a failed attempt to clone Spider-Man
 Peni Parker, an alternate female version of Spider-Man
 Richard and Mary Parker, Spider-Man's biological parents
Richard Parker, the tiger in The Life of Pi
Tej Parker, Fast and The Furious character

See also
Parker (given name)

References

English-language surnames
Occupational surnames
Surnames of English origin
English-language occupational surnames